Mary Day may refer to:

Mary Day (dance teacher) (1910–2006), founder of The Washington Ballet
Mary Anna Day (1852–1924), American botanist and librarian
Mary L. Day (1836–?), American memoirist
Mary Gage Day (1857–1935), American physician and medical writer
Mary Louise Day (1968–2017), teenage girl who mysteriously disappeared from her home